= Bahurupi Natya Sangstha =

Bangladeshi theatre group

- Formation: 1 June 1975
- Type: Theatre group
- Location: Mymensingh, Bangladesh

Bahurupi Natya Sangstha is a Bengali theatre group of Mymensingh, Bangladesh. The group was founded on 1 June 1975. As of 2015, the group's managing director is Helalul Islam, and its secretary is Shahadat Hossain Khan Hilu.

== Productions ==
- Agunmukha
- Daye-daitwa (written by Malay Bhowmik)
- Kabi Priya, a dance-drama written by Sheikh Akram Ali about Kazi Nazrul Islam
- Shasthi
- Shahidera Kotha Boley (homage to language martyrs)
- Shyama (dance-drama)

== Gallery ==
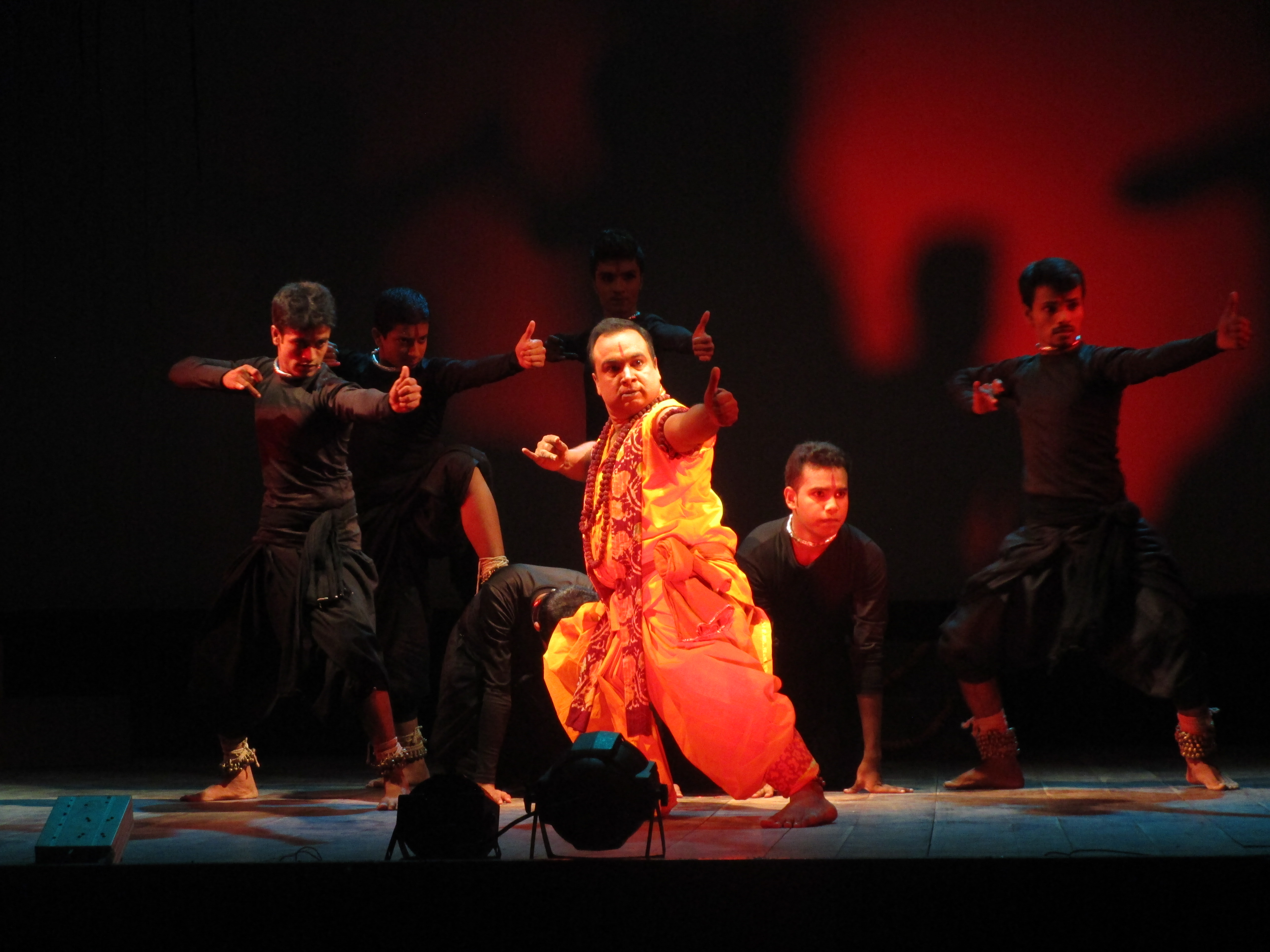
A Production of Chitrangada by Bahurupi Natya Sangstha on 30 July 2015 at Mymensingh Shilpakala Academy।
